Gwernesney is a village in Monmouthshire in southeast Wales.

Location 

Gwernesney is located three miles east of Usk on the B4235 road to Chepstow.

History and amenities 

Gwernesney is set in a rural location close to Usk town. The village church is St Michael and All Angels. The village also has a pub. The South Wales Gliding Club operate towed gliders from nearby - often to be seen over the village.

External links
 Genuki info on Gwernesney
 South Wales Gliding Club

Villages in Monmouthshire